A bear-leader was formerly a man who led bears about the country. In the Middle Ages and the Tudor period, these animals were chiefly used in the blood sport of bear-baiting and were led from village to village. Performing bears were also common; their keepers were generally Frenchmen or Italians.

Later, the phrase "bear-leader" came colloquially to mean a tutor or guardian, who escorted any young man of rank or wealth on his travels.

References

Animal care occupations
Animal welfare
Baiting (blood sport)
Bears
Cruelty to animals
Medieval occupations
Sports occupations and roles
Tudor England